Merce, Mercè or Merče may refer to:

People
 Mercè Boada Rovira (born 1948), Catalan neurologist
 Mercè Bonell, Andorran politician
 Mercè Canela (born 1956), Catalan writer and translator
 Mercè Foradada (born 1947), Spanish writer
 Mercè Prat i Prat (1880–1936), Spanish beatified Roman Catholic nun and martyr
 Mercè Rodoreda (1908–1983), Spanish novelist
 nickname of Mercier Merce Cunningham (1919–2009), American dancer and choreographer
 nickname of Mercer Reynolds (born 1945), American businessman
 José Mercé (born 1955), Spanish flamenco singer born José Soto Soto

Other uses
 Merče, a village in Slovenia
 La Mercè, an annual festival in Barcelona, Spain

See also
 Mercês (disambiguation)

Feminine given names
Spanish-language hypocorisms
Lists of people by nickname